Edwin Holmes may refer to:

 Edwin R. Holmes (1878–1961), United States federal judge
 Edwin Holmes (inventor) (1820–1901), American businessman credited with commercializing the electromagnetic burglar alarm
 Edwin Holmes (astronomer) (1839–1919), English amateur astronomer
 Edwin N. Holmes, head football coach for the Middlebury College Panthers football team, 1915–1917